The 2001–02 season, covering the period from 1 July 2001 to 30 June 2002, was Sport Lisboa e Benfica's 98th season in existence and the club's 68th consecutive season in the top flight of Portuguese football. Benfica competed domestically in the Primeira Liga and the Taça de Portugal (Portuguese Cup), but did not take part in European football due to their league finish in the previous season.

Expectations were high with head coach Toni, who had been part of Benfica's wins in 1988–89 and 1993–94, starting his third complete season with the team. In the transfer market, the club shipped out regular starters from the past seasons and brought in new players, mixing the experience of Zlatko Zahovič and Ljubinko Drulović with acquisitions Pedro Mantorras and Simão Sabrosa. By December the team was still in the title race after seven wins and seven draws. However, that month the team suffered its first defeat, a close draw against Sporting, and their exit from the Taça de Portugal. These setbacks caused Toni to resign and be replaced by his assistant, Jesualdo Ferreira. After the change, Ferreira guided the team to third-place by late March, where several injuries in key players impacted their momentum. They finished the season with 17 wins, twelve draws and five losses, putting them in fourth place and keeping them out of the European league for another year.

Season summary

Pre-season
After the worst season since the start of the Primeira Liga, Benfica made significant changes, starting with bringing in former president of Futebol Clube de Alverca Luís Filipe Vieira to run all football-related affairs. One of his first decisions was transferring players deemed surplus to the new project, including Serhiy Kandaurov, Ronaldo Guiaro, José Calado, and both strikers of the previous season, Pierre van Hooijdonk and João Tomás. Argel Fucks, Ljubinko Drulović and Zlatko Zahovič, all players who gained notability at Porto, were added to the team, along with the highly expected Pedro Mantorras and Simão Sabrosa, the latter costing a record 12 million Euros. With Simão's signing, Filipe Vieira stated, "Now we have a dream-team".

The pre-season started on 5 July in Lisbon, followed by four games in Nyon, Switzerland, beginning 14 July. Later in the month, Benfica returned to Portugal for two more games, playing Feyenoord in Guimarães and closing against Fiorentina on 5 August.

August–October
Benfica started the 2001–02 Primeira Liga campaign on the road against Varzim on 11 August 2001. The game ended with a 2–2 draw, after a stoppage time own-goal from Benfico's Paulo Cabral. A week later, Benfica had its opening game at home, defeating Salgueiros 2–0, with both goals in the second half. They closed the month with a second home win, as Mantorras scored three past Vitória Setúbal in a 3–2 win.

Benfica opened September at Estádio Mário Duarte against home team Beira-Mar. The team took a two-goal lead and "looked like the certain winner" according to João Marcelino of Record, but after a penalty committed by Diogo Luís, Beira-Mar took the lead in four minutes. With Benfica trailing by one, Tomo Šokota scored in the 58th minute to make the final score 3–3. Benfico's next game was a Clássico against Porto on 15 September. The match ended with a 0–0 draw but, as João Marcelino commented, Benfica "built more opportunities to score". On the following Sunday, Benfica visited Belenenses, dropping two more points in the rankings with a one-all draw; it had been a full month since their last victory. On 30 September, Benfica received Alverca. The game ended with a 3–2 win for Benfica, finishing the month just three points shy of the leader, Boavista.

Benfica started October on the road against former manager José Mourinho with União de Leiria. A final score of 1–1 made the fifth draw in just eight games for Benfica, but the team still gained a point on the title race, as Boavista and Porto were tied for first. Their second match of October was played in Da Luz against Gil Vicente on the 20th, and resulted in a 2–0 win for Benfica, after João Mawete opened the score in the second half. They played Farense away on the 26th, where a 2–0 win carried Benfica to second place and ended their eight-month streak without winning an away game.

November–February
Benfica played Vitória Guimarães at home in the beginning of November, resulting in a 0–0 draw that brought Benfica down to third place. On the 17th, Benfica made its debut in the 2001–02 Taça de Portugal, playing Infesta at Matosinhos. They won the game 3–0, with two goals right at the end of first half, an own goal and a penalty. In the last week of November, Benfica played visitor to Braga, winning 1–0 after Mantorras unlocked the game in the 69th minute. It was the club's first away win against Braga since November 1995.

December opened with a home game against Santa Clara. The guests took an early lead, but Simão evened the score only fifteen minutes later; Mantorras then set the final score at a 2–1 win. On 8 December, Benfica played Paços de Ferreira on the road. Although they would have reached first place in the Primeira Liga standings if they had won, Benfica "did not perform to expectations, as the defence was a disaster", according to Manuel Queiroz of Record. The game ended in a 1–2 loss, the first loss of the season. Four days later, Benfica played a fifth round Taça de Portugal game against Marítimo. The game went into overtime after no goals from either team in regular time; Two minutes into overtime, Marítimo scored. Benfica evened the score in the 116th minute, narrowly avoiding its second loss in a row. On 15 December, Benfica hosted Sporting. The game ended in a 2–2 draw, despite Benfica leading by two nil until the last five minutes, when Mário Jardel scored a double and saved the cross-town rivals from defeat. On the 19th, Benfica went to Madeira to play in the Portuguese Cup in a rematch against Marítimo. A sole goal from Mitchell van der Gaag knocked Benfica out of the competition. Benfica's last game of 2001 was on the road against Boavista. An early goal from Boavista made the game very difficult, as Manuel Queiroz explained in his match analysis: "It was a game at their [Boavista's] style. Ball in the center, intense fighting, score early and then manage time, free-kicks and bookings... Benfica could not connect two passes, and even make a single imminent goal threat". With that the team took a second league loss. Four days later, Toni resigned, with Benfica looking for Mourinho to return. Disagreements over the composition of the technical staff caused Mourinho to decline the invitation, so Benfica turned to assistant manager Jesualdo Ferreira to lead the team.

Benfica opened the new year at home, once more against Marítimo; the game ended 1–1 as the eighth draw of the season, sliding Benfica down to fifth place in the league. On the 8th, Benfica added Edgaras Jankauskas on loan from Real Sociedad to their roster, strengthening a sector that only had Mantorras as reliable option. In the second week of January, Benfica played Varzim at home. After trailing at halftime 2–0, Benfica scored three in less than fifteen minutes for a final score of 3–2, the first win since 2 December. Three days later, Benfica improved its squad again, signing Tiago Mendes from Braga, with Armando Sá also moving to Lisbon. On 19 January, with Tiago already in the lineup, Benfica played Salgueiros at Estádio Engenheiro Vidal Pinheiro. The game ended in a 4–1 win for Benfica, defined by Record as the team's "first comfortable win in the league, and the first improvements after the comatose state that led to managerial change". On the final Sunday of the month, Benfica visited Bonfim to face Vitória de Setúbal. Benfica scored first with a goal from Carlitos in the 20th minute, but couldn't keep the lead, resulting in yet another draw.

On 3 February, Benfica received Beira-Mar in Da Luz. António Tadeira characterized the game for Record, complementing the team's effectiveness: "The unprecedented scoring ratio, turned a poor and colourless performance into a satisfying thrashing". The 4–1 win brought Benfica to third place. A week later, Benfica faced Porto at Estádio das Antas for the Clássico. Despite Simão scoring first, Benfica's old rival reversed the game, giving the team a 2–3 loss that dropped them to fourth place. On 17 February, the team played Belenenses at home, winning 2–1 with a last minute goal from Jankauskas. Benfica played the last game of February on the 24th, away at Alverca. They managed to take a two-goal lead halfway through the second half, with goals by Zahovic and João Manuel Pinto Tomé. The last goal in the 3–1 win was netted by Drulovic one minute before regular time ended. With the end of February, Benfica was placed fourth in the league standings.

March–May
In the opening match of March, Benfica faced União de Leiria at home. The game ended with a 0–2 loss, the first ever win for the visitors in Da Luz, with José Manuel Delgado and Luís Pedro Sousa criticizing the team for a "really poor game of the home side". Benfica recovered their step when they played Gil Vicente at Estádio Adelino Ribeiro Novo on the 9th; they took an early lead in the first half with a goal by Argel, with Drulovic doubling the score fifteen minutes later for a 2–0 victory. On 18 March, Benfica played Farense at home. Jesualdo played Simão upfront, and as Joaquim Semeano of Record stated, "the small-great player confirmed his good momentum, giving speed to the game every time he touched the ball". The team won 5–0 and regained third place over Porto. They went on to win their third match in a row against Vitória Guimarães at the Estádio D. Afonso Henriques with a score of 4–1, including a double from Miguel Monteiro. However, just days later, Simão was severely injured while playing for the Portugal national football team, and was expected to miss several months. At the last game of the month, Benfica hosted Braga with Jankauskas, Simão and Sokota all sidelined by injuries. Without any firepower, the team took a 1–1 draw, allowing Porto to catch up in the league race.

Benfica opened April in Azores against Santa Clara on the 6th. Lacking attacking options, the team was unable to score and ended with a goalless draw; they remained ahead of Porto only with the goal difference. On 14 April, Benfica received Paços de Ferreira at home. With two goals in the first half and another two in the second, the team won 4–0 and remained in third. A week later, Benfica visited Sporting for the second Derby de Lisboa of the season. Despite a first score by Jankauskas, a mistake by Armando Sá allowed Sporting's Jardel to score from the penalty spot. With its third draw in just one month, Benfica was overtaken by Porto in the league table, dropping to fourth. On the 28th, Benfica hosted Boavista, knowing that by beating them, they would award the league title to Sporting. The meet ended with a 2–1 win for Benfica, after Mantorras took advantage of an error from Bassey William Andem in the 81st minute, confirming the second title in three years for Sporting.

Benfica played its last game of the season on 5 May, on the road against Marítimo. They closed the season with a 2–3 loss. 17 wins, twelve draws and five losses during the season gave Benfica a league score of 63 points, putting the team 12 behind champion Sporting, but crucially, five behind Porto, placing fourth and missing out on UEFA competitions for a second year in a row.

Competitions

Overall record

Primeira Liga

League table

Results by round

Matches

Taça de Portugal

Friendlies

Player statistics
The squad for the season consisted of the players listed in the tables below, as well as staff members Toni (manager) and Jesualdo Ferreira (manager).

|}

Transfers

In

In by loan

Out

Out by loan

Notes

References

Bibliography
 

S.L. Benfica seasons
Benfica